In abstract algebra, the Chien search, named after Robert Tienwen Chien, is a fast algorithm for determining roots of polynomials defined over a finite field. Chien search is commonly used to find the roots of error-locator polynomials encountered in decoding Reed-Solomon codes and BCH codes.

Algorithm
The problem is to find the roots of the polynomial  (over the finite field ):

If the polynomial evaluates to zero, then that element is a root.

For the trivial case , only the coefficient  need be tested for zero. Below, the only concern will be for non-zero .

A straightforward evaluation of the polynomial involves  general multiplications and  additions.  A more efficient scheme would use Horner's method for  general multiplications and  additions.  Both of these approaches may evaluate the elements of the finite field in any order.

Chien search improves upon the above by selecting a specific order for the non-zero elements. In particular, the finite field has a (constant) generator element . Chien tests the elements in the generator's order .  Consequently, Chien search needs only  multiplications by constants and  additions.  The multiplications by constants are less complex than general multiplications.

The Chien search is based on two observations:

Thus the powers  for  cover the entire field (excluding the zero element).
 The following relationship exists:

In other words, we may define each  as the sum of a set of terms , from which the next set of coefficients may be derived thus:

If at any stage the resultant summation is zero, i.e.

then  also, so  is a root.  In this way, we check every element in the field.

When implemented in hardware, this approach significantly reduces the complexity, as all multiplications consist of one variable and one constant, rather than two variables as in the brute-force approach.

References

Error detection and correction
Finite fields